A regional stock exchange is a term used in the United States to describe stock exchanges that operate outside of the country's main financial center in New York City.  A regional stock exchange operates in the trading of listed and over-the-counter (OTC) equities under the SEC's Unlisted Trading Privileges (UTP) rule.

History of regional stock exchanges
The SEC was formed in 1934, and that year, a total of 24 securities exchanges registered with the SEC, while 19 received temporary exemptions from registration. Exchanges actively trading that year included the New Orleans Stock Exchange, the Richmond Stock Exchange, the San Francisco Curb Exchange, the San Francisco Mining Exchange, and the St. Louis Stock Exchange. Ten stock exchanges closed after the SEC was created, including the Boston Curb Market, the Buffalo Stock Exchange, the Chicago Curb Exchange, the Denver Stock Market, the Hartford Stock Market, the Milwaukee Grain and Stock Exchange, the New York Mining Exchange, the New York Real Estate Securities Exchange, the Seattle Stock Exchange, and the Wheeling Stock Exchange. The New York Produce Exchange decided to stop trading in securities as well.

In April 1941, eighteen regional stock exchanges received invitations to "parley" with the SEC on possible amendments to the Securities Act to be presented to Congress that May. The exchange representatives attended the conference on April 28, 1941 to discuss the issue.

List of regional stock exchanges

Current
Regional exchanges currently registered with the SEC include:
 Boston Stock Exchange (BSE or BSX), acquired by NASDAQ in 2007
 Chicago Board Options Exchange (CBSX)
 Chicago Stock Exchange (CHX), acquired by NYSE in 2019
 National Stock Exchange (NSX), acquired by NYSE in 2017
 Pacific Stock Exchange (PSE), acquired by NYSE in 2006
 Philadelphia Stock Exchange (PHLX), the nation's first stock exchange, acquired by NASDAQ in 2007

The Cincinnati Stock Exchange moved to Chicago and changed its name to the National Stock Exchange. It moved again to its current location in Jersey City, New Jersey.

Historical
There used to be many more such exchanges in the United States. Among those that have become defunct or have merged into the survivors listed above are
Baltimore, which merged with Philadelphia in 1949 (Baltimore Stock Exchange)
Buffalo, New York, which closed in 1936 (Buffalo Stock Exchange)
Cleveland, which merged with Chicago in 1949 (Cleveland Stock Exchange)
Colorado Springs, which closed in 1966 (Colorado Springs Stock Exchange)
Denver, which closed in 1936 (Denver Stock Exchange)
Detroit, which closed in 1976 (Detroit Stock Exchange)
Hartford, which closed in 1934 (Hartford Stock Exchange)
Honolulu, which closed in 1977 (Honolulu Stock Exchange)
Los Angeles and San Francisco, which merged to form the Pacific Exchange in 1957
Louisville, Kentucky, which closed in 1935 (Louisville Stock Exchange)
Milwaukee, which closed in 1938 (Milwaukee Stock Exchange)
Minneapolis-St. Paul, which merged with Chicago in 1949 (Minneapolis-St. Paul Stock Exchange)
New Orleans, which merged with Chicago in 1959 (New Orleans Stock Exchange)
Pittsburgh, which merged with Philadelphia in 1969 (Pittsburgh Stock Exchange)
Richmond, Virginia, which closed in 1972 (Richmond Stock Exchange)
St. Louis, which merged with Chicago in 1949 (St. Louis Stock Exchange)
Salt Lake City, which closed in 1986 (Intermountain Stock Exchange)
Seattle, which closed in 1942 (Seattle Stock Exchange)
Spokane, Washington, which closed in 1991 (Spokane Stock Exchange)
Washington, D.C., which merged with Philadelphia in 1953 (Washington Stock Exchange)
Wheeling, West Virginia, which closed in 1965 (Wheeling Stock Exchange)

See also 
 List of stock exchanges
 List of former stock exchanges in the Americas
 List of stock exchanges in the Americas

References

Economy of the United States